Burg Castle may refer to:

 Burg Castle (Solingen), in the German state of North Rhine-Westphalia
 Burg Castle (Burg im Leimental), in the Swiss canton of Basel-Landschaft

See also

 Berg Castle, in Luxembourg
 Berg Castle (Bavaria)